The 2012 U.S. Olympic diving team trials were held from June 17 to June 23, 2012, at the Weyerhaeuser King County Aquatic Center in Federal Way, Washington.

U.S. Olympic team
The following divers have qualified to compete at the 2012 Summer Olympics:
Men

Women

Results

Men's events

Women's events

Notes and references

 https://secure.meetcontrol.com/divemeets/system/meetresultsext.php?meetnum=2039&organization=USAD
 http://www.federalwaymirror.com/sports/160399805.html

See also
 United States at the 2012 Summer Olympics
 United States Olympic Trials (diving)
 USA Diving

Diving competitions in the United States
United States Summer Olympics Trials